Aryankavu is a village located in the Kollam district of the Indian state of Kerala. It lies close to the border between Kerala and Tamil Nadu near Thenmala. It is also one of the famous pilgrimage sites associated with the legend of Sabarimala. The village is located besides Shendurney Wildlife Sanctuary.

Location and connectivity
The village is well connected with Punalur, Kollam, Tenkasi and Thiruvananthapuram through both Tamil Nadu State Transport Corporation and Kerala State Road Transport Corporation.

The village lies along a mountain pass in Western Ghats called Aryankavu Pass or Schencottah Gap. The Kollam–Sengottai railway line also passes through Aryankavu and there are two railway stations in Aryankavu namely New Aryankavu railway station and Aryankavu railway station.

The nearby airports are Trivandrum International Airport, Madurai Airport and Tuticorin Airport.

Demographics
 India census, Aryankavu had a population of 12125 with 5949 males and 6176 females. The most spoken languages in Aryankavu are Malayalam and English. But due to its closest proximity to Tamil Nadu, Tamil  is also widely spoken and understood . There is also Malai Pandaram tribal population in Aryankavu.

Aryankavu Pass/ Schencottah Gap 
It is a mountain pass connecting Kollam district and Tenkasi district and the village is located along this pass. This pass along with Palakkad Gap and Aralvaimozhi gap is a significant pass that connects Kerala side of Western Ghats with Coromandel Coastal plains of Tamil Nadu. The Kollam–Sengottai railway line and National Highway 744 passes through this pass. In the western end of the gap there is Kallada River valley. The pass plays an important role in the climate of nearby Punalur as it keeps the mercury levels in the town significantly higher than nearby areas.

The gap along with Achankovil Shear Zone plays the role of an ecological divide. It separate the Agasthyamala Biosphere Reserve from Cardamom Hills and High Range of Kerala.

Attractions

Palaruvi water falls
The name `Paal' means milk & `Aruvi' means stream. There is a train named Palaruvi Express that passes through Aryankavu which is named after this falls.

Kadamanpara Sandal Forest
It is the second largest natural sandal forest after Marayur. It is situated in Aryankavu Grama panchayath.

Rose Mala
Rose Mala is a place in Aryankavu which is 11.8 km away from Aryankavu Junction. It is one of the ecotourism spots which provides view of Thenmala Dam reservoir. There is a view point called Rajathottam near Rosemala which offers view of Tenkasi.

Nedumpara
Harrisons Malayalam limited has a rubber estate in this place named as Isfield Estate. One of the highest peak of Kollam district named Nedumpara Peak is located in Nedumpara, which is locally known as Nedumpara Motta. It is the water divide between Kallada River and Achankovil river.

Bourdillon's Plot
It is the world's first stump planted plantation of teak which located near the Palaruvi Falls in Aryankavu. A British man named T. F. Bourdillon was its leader.  He was then conservator of Travancore.

Ambanad Hills 
Ambanad Hills is the only tea estate of Kollam district. It is also one of the largest Clove plantation in Kerala. The estate also has tangerine plantations.

Religion
Hinduism is the major religion at the village. There is also a sizeable Christian and Muslim population.

Aryankavu Shastha Temple 

Aryankavu's Ayyappan temple in Tenkasi District is a most important temple dedicated to Lord Ayyappa in Tamil Nadu. The shrine is also known as Aryankavu Shastha Temple. Lord Ayyappa is depicted here as a teenager (young boy). Ayyappa is known as Thiru Aryan and therefore the place got the name Aryankavu.

Surrounded by forests, the temple is located on the National Highway 744. Just like in Sabarimala, women from the age 10 to 50 are not allowed inside the Aryankavu Ayyappa Temple. The rituals and pujas followed at Aryankavu Sastha Temple is that of Sourastrian tradition. The sanctum sanctorum of the temple has idols of Pushkaladevi, Shiva and Sastha. A young Ayyappa sits in the middle with Pushkaladevi on the left side and Shiva on the right side.

The festival at the temple is celebrated during the concluding days of the Sabarimala Mandala Kalam. The most important festivals observed here include Pandiyan Mudippu, Tirukkalyanam and Kumbhabhishekam. There are plans to include the temple as part of Sabarimala circuit.

Other religious places 
There are two catholic churches: St. Mary's Catholic Church Archdiocese of Changanassery & St. George Malankara Catholic Church at Arankavu. The St. George Malankara Catholic Church was established 1950's. The founder of the Church was Mr.K.V Abraham Vaidyer (Kaleekal) also known as Kannadi Vaidyar. He was an Ayurvedic physician as well as a member of the Grama Panchayat in 1957.

There are also numerous Evangelicalist churches that are active in the area.

The major center of worship of Muslims is the Edappalayam Juma Masjid.

See also
 Palakkad Gap
 Aralvaimozhi

References

External links

Villages in Kollam district